Fritz Riess or Rieß (11 July 1922 in Nuremberg – 15 May 1991 in Samedan, Switzerland) was a racing driver from Germany. He participated in one Formula One World Championship Grand Prix, on 3 August 1952.  He finished seventh, scoring no championship points as only the first five finishers scored points at that time.

Riess also won the 1952 24 Hours of Le Mans for Mercedes-Benz, sharing the drive with Hermann Lang.

Racing record

Complete Formula One World Championship results
(key)

Complete 24 Hours of Le Mans results

References 

1922 births
1991 deaths
24 Hours of Le Mans drivers
24 Hours of Le Mans winning drivers
German Formula One drivers
German racing drivers
Sportspeople from Nuremberg
Racing drivers from Bavaria
World Sportscar Championship drivers